Bribbaree is a small village in the South West Slopes region of New South Wales, Australia spanning the boundary of Weddin Shire and Hilltops Council.

History
Bribbaree was declared a village in the Shire of Burrangong on 23 March 1917. 34.8 hectares (86 acres) were set aside for the township, with a further 97 hectares (240 acres) designated suburban land. A sale of Crown Lands was subsequently held in Young on 8 August 1917 at which all but six of the 29 lots offered were sold.

The settlement was named after the adjacent Bribbaree Creek. According to C. A. Irish, the name "Bribbaree" is derived from "Boorri-Boolla", a combination of "Boorri" meaning "boy" and "Boollo", "two", from a nearby rock formation.

A monument to the five soldiers from Bribbaree who died in World War I was erected in 1921–1922. They were Charles Ernest Downey, Alfred Downey, Anthony Steel Caldwell, Hugh Wallace McAlister and Percy William Geraty.

The population of Bribbaree was reported as 267 at the 2011 census, and 141 at the 2016 census and had increased to 144 at the 2021 census.

See also
Bribbaree railway station

References

Towns in New South Wales
Weddin Shire
Hilltops Council